Marianna "Anna" Leszczyńska (25 May 1699 – 20 June 1717) was the eldest child of Stanisław Leszczyński and Catherine Opalińska. Her sister, Maria Leszczyńska, became Queen of France in 1725.

Life

Childhood 
Marianna Leszczyńska was born on 25 May 1699 in Poland, as the eldest child of Stanisław Leszczyński and Catherine Opalińska. Marianna was named after her paternal grandmother, Anna Jabłonowska, and was often called “Anna”. 

Her only sister, Maria Leszczyńska, was born four years later in 1703 and was later crowned Queen of France as the consort of Louis XV. Between Stanisław’s two daughters, Marianna seems to have been the favourite. She, reportedly, received a good education.

Death 
Marianna died of pneumonia at the age of 18 in the district of Mandelbachtal in Saarpfalz-Kreis. She is buried in Gräfinthal cloister. Although her father called many doctors to her bedside, they likely accelerated her death by applying multiple purges and bleeding.

Her death devastated the Leszczyński family, especially her father, whom asked his second daughter Maria to never pronounce the name of Anna before him again. Maria followed his instructions so carefully, even in front of her husband, that years later he was surprised to learn that she had a sister.

Ancestry

References

1699 births
1717 deaths
18th-century Polish women
Anna
Polish princesses
Deaths from pneumonia in Germany
18th-century Polish nobility
Daughters of kings